The 1883 Georgetown football team represented the Georgetown University during the 1883 college football season.  Georgetown's official records do not include any games prior to 1887, however media guides prior to 1950 included this season's results, and Gallaudet records the 1883 match-ups as its first games.  The November 20 game is recorded as the first college football game in Washington, D.C.

Schedule

See also
 List of the first college football games in each US state

References

Georgetown
Georgetown Hoyas football seasons
College football winless seasons
Georgetown football